Got Your Back (2011) is Pour Habit's second full-length album released through Fat Wreck Chords in 2011.

Track listing

"Dead Soldier’s Bay"
"Heads of State"
"Greenery"
"Matter of Opinion"
"East 69th"
"Head in the Clouds (Danny’s Song)"
"Party"
"Teens Turned to Fiends"
"Tomahawk"
"For All Who Have Given and Lost"
"Gutterblock Boy"
"The Expert"
"Conscience Mind of Revelation"

2011 albums
Fat Wreck Chords albums
Pour Habit albums